A memoir is any nonfiction narrative writing based in the author's personal memories. The assertions made in the work are thus understood to be factual. While memoir has historically been defined as a subcategory of biography or autobiography since the late 20th century, the genre is differentiated in form, presenting a narrowed focus, usually a particular time phase in someone's life or career. A biography or autobiography tells the story "of a life", while a memoir often tells the story of a particular, career, event, or time, such as touchstone moments and turning points from the author's life. The author of a memoir may be referred to as a memoirist or a memorialist.

Early memoirs
Memoirs have been written since the ancient times, as shown by Julius Caesar's Commentarii de Bello Gallico, also known as Commentaries on the Gallic Wars. In the work, Caesar describes the battles that took place during the nine years that he spent fighting local armies in the Gallic Wars. His second memoir, Commentarii de Bello Civili (or Commentaries on the Civil War) is an account of the events that took place between 49 and 48 BC in the civil war against Gnaeus Pompeius and the Senate. The noted Libanius, teacher of rhetoric who lived between an estimated 314 and 394 AD, framed his life memoir as one of his literary orations, which were written to be read aloud in the privacy of his study. This kind of memoir refers to the idea in ancient Greece and Rome, that memoirs were like "memos", or pieces of unfinished and unpublished writing, which a writer might use as a memory aid to make a more finished document later on.

The Sarashina Nikki is an example of an early Japanese memoir, written in the Heian period. A genre of book writing, Nikki Bungaku, emerged during this time.
 
In the Middle Ages, Geoffrey of Villehardouin, Jean de Joinville, and Philippe de Commines wrote memoirs, while the genre was represented toward the end of the Renaissance, through the works of Blaise de Montluc and Margaret of Valois, that she was the first woman to write her Memoirs in modern-style.

Until the Age of Enlightenment encompassing the 17th and 18th centuries, works of memoir were written by Anthony Ashley-Cooper, 1st Earl of Shaftesbury; François de La Rochefoucauld, Prince de Marcillac of France; and Louis de Rouvroy, duc de Saint-Simon, who wrote Memoirs at his family's home at the castle of La Ferté-Vidame. While Saint-Simon was considered a writer possessing a high level of skill for narrative and character development, it wasn't until well after his death that his work as a memoirist was recognized, resulting in literary fame.

From the eighteenth century

Over the latter half of the 18th through the mid-20th century, memoirists generally included those who were noted within their chosen profession. These authors wrote as a way to record and publish their own account of their public exploits. Authors included politicians or people in court society and were later joined by military leaders and businessmen. An exception to these models is Henry David Thoreau's 1854 memoir Walden, which presents his experiences over the course of two years in a cabin he built near Walden Pond.

Twentieth-century war memoirs became a genre of their own, including, from the First World War, Ernst Jünger (Storm of Steel) and Frederic Manning's  Her Privates We. Memoirs documenting incarceration by Nazi Germany during the war include Primo Levi's If This Is a Man, which covers his arrest as a member of the Italian Resistance Movement, followed by his life as a prisoner in Auschwitz; and Elie Wiesel's Night, which is based on his life prior to and during his time in the Auschwitz, Buna Werke, and Buchenwald concentration camps.

Memoirs today
In the early 1990s, memoirs written by ordinary people experienced a sudden upsurge, as an increasing number of people realized that their ancestors’ and their own stories were about to disappear, in part as a result of the opportunities and distractions of technological advances. At the same time, psychology and other research began to show that familiarity with genealogy helps people find their place in the world and that life review helps people come to terms with their own past.

With the advent of inexpensive digital book production in the first decade of the 21st century, the genre exploded. Memoirs written as a way to pass down a personal legacy, rather than as a literary work of art or historical document, are emerging as a personal and family responsibility.

The Association of Personal Historians was a trade association for professionals who assisted individuals, families, and organizations in documenting their life stories. It dissolved in 2017.

Collections 
With the expressed interest of preserving history through the eyes of those who lived it, some organizations work with potential memoirists to bring their work to fruition. The Veterans History Project, for example, compiles the memoirs of those who have served in a branch of the United States Armed Forces – especially those who have seen active combat.

Academia 
The term 'memoir' has been used in an academic context to describe an essay on a learned subject. Examples include explanatory texts accompanying geologic maps.

See also

 Diary
 Fake memoirs
 Graphic memoir
 Histoire de ma vie
 Last will and testament

References

Further reading 

 "What Is a Memoir?". Celadon Books. 2019-09-06. Retrieved 2022-06-30.
 "How to Start Writing a Memoir: 14 Tips for Starting Your Memoir". Writer's Hive Media. 2022-06-17. Retrieved 2022-06-30.
 "So You Think You Can Write a Memoir?". Columbia Magazine. Retrieved 2022-06-30.

Non-fiction genres
 
Works about history